Mount Huckaby is an ice-free, wedge-shaped mountain in the western part of the Wisconsin Range in Antarctica. The mountain was mapped by the United States Geological Survey from surveys and U.S. Navy air photos, 1960–64, and was named by the Advisory Committee on Antarctic Names for Commander Donnie W. Huckaby, a maintenance officer at McMurdo Station for U.S. Navy Squadron VX-6 during 1962–63 and 1963–64.

References

Mountains of Marie Byrd Land